The 1993–94 season was VfB Leipzig's only season in the Bundesliga to date. It was a difficult season for the club, which saw them finish bottom of the table with just three wins (all 1–0).

Squad

Results

Bundesliga

DFB-Pokal

Transfers

External links
 Season details at fussballdaten 

1. FC Lokomotive Leipzig seasons
Leipzig, VfB